Alheim is a municipality in Hersfeld-Rotenburg district in northeastern Hesse, Germany. It is named after nearby Alheimer Mountain. Alheim consist of 10 former souverain villages situated on both banks of the river Fulda.

Geography

Location 
The community lies in Hersfeld-Rotenburg district some 35 km southeast of Kassel and a few kilometres northwest of Rotenburg an der Fulda. It stretches along both banks of the Fulda into the Knüllgebirge (range) and the Stölzinger Gebirge. In this latter range the community’s landmark can be found, the 549 m-high Alheimer.

Constituent communities 
Alheim’s Ortsteile are Baumbach (founded before 1003), Erdpenhausen, Hergershausen, Licherode, Niederellenbach, Niedergude (founded before 960), Oberellenbach, Obergude (founded before 960), Sterkelshausen (founded before 1003) and Heinebach.

The population is some 5,300, of whom more than 2,500 live in Heinebach, the biggest of the ten constituent communities and Alheim’s economic hub.

Neighbouring communities 
Alheim borders in the north on the community of Morschen and the town of Spangenberg (both in the Schwalm-Eder-Kreis), in the east on the town of Rotenburg an der Fulda, in the south on the community of Ludwigsau (both in Hersfeld-Rotenburg) and in the west on the community of Knüllwald (in the Schwalm-Eder-Kreis).

Politics

Community council 
The municipal election held on 26 March 2006 yielded the following results:

Mayor 
The last mayoral elections yielded the following results:

In the last mayoral election on 14 September 2008, the incumbent mayor Georg Lüdtke (SPD) was reëlected with 65.6% of the vote against independent Lothar Schäfer, who got 26.0%, and Michael Werner (FDP), who got 8.4%.

Town partnerships 
 Zandhoven, Antwerp province, Belgium since 2001

The partnership actually began in 1971 when one came into being between Heinebach, now Alheim’s biggest centre, and Pulle, which has since become part of Zandhoven.

Municipal area’s development

Establishment 
Within the framework of municipal reform, the villages named above were merged into the new community of Alheim on 1 August 1972.

Culture and sightseeing

Walking loops, each based on a theme, have been built. Foremost among these are the mining history learning and adventure path (Bergbauhistorischer Lern- und Erlebnispfad), the water adventure path (Wassererlebnispfad) and the cultural history hiking loop (kulturhistorischer Rundwanderweg)

A popular outing or hiking destination is the Alheimer-Turm (tower) on the like-named mountain in the Stölzinger Gebirge.

Buildings 
The churches in some of the community’s centres have been preserved with their mediaeval defensive walls.
On the Heineberg, remains of a wall are preserved stemming from fortifications built in the 8th or 10th century. During digs in 1974, an early mediaeval church’s foundation was unearthed.

Famous people 
 Franz Christian Gundlach, fashion photographer and curator (b. 1926 in Heinebach)
 Manfred Siebald, Christian songwriter (b. 1948 in Baumbach)

References

External links 
 Sterkelshausen 
 Heinebach 
 Obergude 
  

Hersfeld-Rotenburg